Alseodaphne foxiana is a species of plant in the family Lauraceae. It is endemic to Peninsular Malaysia.

References

foxiana
Endemic flora of Peninsular Malaysia
Least concern biota of Asia
Least concern plants
Taxonomy articles created by Polbot